, known as Hot Shots Golf 3 in North America, is the third game in the Everybody's Golf series and the first game released for the PlayStation 2.

Release
It was released on 26 July 2001 in Japan and 12 March 2002 in North America. It was not released in Europe or Australia.

Reception

The game received "favourable" reviews according to the review aggregation website Metacritic. In Japan, Famitsu gave it a score of 33 out of 40.

Maxim gave it a perfect score of all five stars and said that the game was "easier to play than a sorority co-ed. In fact, the gameplay is so basic you can handle it easily while half in the bag". Playboy gave it 88% and called it "a perfect virtual getaway -- without the pretension". However, The Cincinnati Enquirer gave it four stars out of five, saying: "[Don't] be disillusioned by the fun and light-hearted presentation: 'Hot Shots Golf 3' is deep where it counts – the game play".

By July 2006, the game had sold 800,000 copies and earned $22 million in the United States. Next Generation ranked it as the 77th highest-selling game launched for the PlayStation 2, Xbox or GameCube between January 2000 and July 2006 in that country. Combined sales of Everybody's Golf games released between those dates reached 2 million units in the United States by July 2006.

References

External links
 

2001 video games
Golf video games
PlayStation 2 games
PlayStation 2-only games
Sony Interactive Entertainment games
Everybody's Golf
Video games developed in Japan